Silhouettea is a genus of gobies native to the Indian Ocean and the western Pacific Ocean. The name of this genus refers to the island of Silhouette in the Seychelles where the type specimens of the type species, Silhouettea insinuans, were collected.

Species
There are currently 10 recognized species in this genus:
 Silhouettea aegyptia (Chabanaud, 1933) (Red Sea goby)
 Silhouettea capitlineta J. E. Randall, 2008
 Silhouettea chaimi Goren, 1978
 Silhouettea dotui (Takagi, 1957)
 Silhouettea evanida Larson & P. J. Miller, 1986
 Silhouettea hoesei Larson & P. J. Miller, 1986
 Silhouettea indica Visweswara Rao, 1971
 Silhouettea insinuans J. L. B. Smith, 1959 (Phantom goby)
 Silhouettea nuchipunctatus (Herre, 1934)
 Silhouettea sibayi Farquharson, 1970 (Barebreast goby)

References

 
Gobiinae
Taxonomy articles created by Polbot